Drosera macrophylla, the showy sundew, is a perennial tuberous species in the genus Drosera that is endemic to Western Australia. It is a common species east of Perth. It grows in loam soils. It flowers from June to October. D. macrophylla was first described by John Lindley in his 1839 publication A sketch of the vegetation of the Swan River Colony. In 1992, Allen Lowrie and Sherwin Carlquist described a new subspecies, D. macrophylla subsp. monantha, which is distinguished from D. macrophylla subsp. macrophylla by its single-flowered or rarely biflowered inflorescences. Subspecies monantha is abundant in the Bruce Rock/Merredin region.

See also 
List of Drosera species

References

External links 

Carnivorous plants of Australia
Caryophyllales of Australia
macrophylla
Eudicots of Western Australia
Plants described in 1839